Olivier Masmonteil (born September 23, 1973, Romilly-sur-Seine, France) is a French artist. He studied at the École des Beaux-Arts de Bordeaux from 1996 to 1999. As a painter, Olivier Masmonteil dedicates his work exclusively to landscapes. While offering a variety of treatment, the paintings of Olivier Masmonteil assume a thematic unity which the landscape is both the substance and form, subject and object, the content and container.
Globetrotter artist, he has started a second world tour in Asia (India, Thailand, Vietnam) and South America (Chile, Brazil).

Selected works
Tempête à Giverny, 2011, oil on canvas, 89 x 116 cm
La Dordogne, 2010, Acrylic on canvas, 180 x 270 cm (French Ministry of Foreign Affairs collection)
Cascade Argentine, 2010, Acrylic and oil on canvas, 235 x 240 cm (Fondation Eileen S. Kaminsky Family collection)
Routes du monde, 2009, Acrylic on canvas, 27 x 35 cm each (Fondation Colas collection)
Augenweide XVI, 2004, oil on canvas, 250 x 280.5 cm (FNAC collection)

Exhibitions

Solo exhibitions (selection)
2020:

 Serial Colors, L’Artothèque, Caen (à venir)

 Horizons so big, Suquet des artistes, Pôle d'art moderne et contemporain de Cannes

 The veil erased, Galerie Thomas Bernard - Cortex Athletico, Paris

2019:

 Countryside, Galerie Thomas Bernard - Cortex Athletico, Paris

2018:

 The space of metamorphoses, Cité des Arts, Chambéry

2017:

 From Gimel to Ushuaia, château de Sédières, Clergoux (Corrèze)

2016:

 Portrait, Galerie Dukan, Saint Ouen

2015:

 LE put in Diane, Patio Art Opera, Paris

2014: 

 A week and a day in Prague/ A week and a day in Prague, Dvorak Sec Contemporary Gallery, Prague

 Courtesans, Galerie D.X, Bordeaux 

 The memory of the past, Galerie Dukan, Paris

2012:
Place, La Galerie du Nouvel-Ontario, Ontario, Canada
Olivier Masmonteil, Galerie du CAUE, Limoges, France
2011:
Walden ou la vie dans les bois, Galerie Domi Nostrae, Lyon, France
2010:
The long and winding road, Galerie Dukan&Hourdequin, Marseille, France
Quelle que soit la minute de jour, Chapelle de la Visitation, Thonon-les-Bains, France
2007:
Olivier Masmonteil, Klare Ferne, French Institute, Berlin, Germany 
2006:
Pêcher l’eau, Galerie Suzanne Tarasiève, Paris, France
2005:
Olivier Masmonteil, Augenweide, Michael Schultz Gallery, Berlin, Germany

Group exhibitions (selection)

2012:
Plaisirs de France, curated by Philippe Costamagna, Baku, Azerbaijan and Almaty, Kazakhstan
2011:
A Glimpse at French Contemporary Painting, Galeria Tap Seac, Macao, China
Des paysages, des figures. Carte blanche à Olivier Masmonteil, Le Château de Saint-Ouen, Saint-Ouen, France
2010:
Collection 3, Fondation pour l’art contemporain Claudine et Jean-Marc Salomon, Alex, France
2008:
Délicatesse des couleurs, Hangar 7, Salzburg, Germany
2007:
Peinture: Génération 70, Fondation pour l’art contemporain Claudine et Jean-Marc Salomon, Alex, France
2004:
Climats, cyclothymie des paysages, Centre national d’art et du paysage, Vassivière-en-Limousin, France

Awards, grants and residencies (selection)
2005-2006:
Residency Spinnerei, Leipzig, Germany
2002-2003:
Residency La Source-Villarceaux, France
2002
Painting Prize, Fondation Coffim, France

Collections
FRAC (Regional Contemporary Art Funds) Haute-Normandie, France
French Ministry of Foreign Affairs, Paris, France
Eileen S. Kaminsky Family Foundation, New York, USA
Claudine and Jean-Marc Salomon Foundation, France
Colas Foundation, France
FNAC (National Contemporary Art Fund), France
FRAC (Regional Contemporary Art Funds) Alsace, France

References

Further reading

External links
Artist's Website
Artist’s page on doukan hourdequin gallery’s website

1973 births
Living people
People from Romilly-sur-Seine
20th-century French painters
20th-century French male artists
French male painters
21st-century French painters
21st-century French male artists
École des Beaux-Arts alumni